= Davvas =

District in Iran

Davvas (in Persian : دواس) is a neighborhood in Bushehr which is located near the Persian Gulf.

In 2025, an explosion occurred in Davvas.
